Korotovsky is a rural locality (a khutor) in Srednetsaritsynskoye Rural Settlement, Serafimovichsky District, Volgograd Oblast, Russia. The population was 186 as of 2010. There are 5 streets.

Geography 
Korotovsky is located 37 km southwest of Serafimovich (the district's administrative centre) by road. Srednetsaritsynsky is the nearest rural locality.

References 

Rural localities in Serafimovichsky District